HMS Sutlej was a  armoured cruiser built for the Royal Navy around 1900. Upon completion she was assigned to the China Station. In 1906 she became a training ship for the North America and West Indies Station before returning home and being assigned as the flagship of the reserve Third Fleet in 1909. Relieved as flagship in 1910, she remained in reserve until the beginning of World War I in August 1914.

She was spent most of the war on convoy escort duties before becoming an accommodation ship in 1917 and then a depot ship in 1918. Sutlej was sold for scrap in 1921, but was not broken up until 1924.

Design and description
Sutlej was designed to displace . The engines were powered by 30 Belleville boilers. On their sea trials all of the Cressy-class cruisers, except the lead ship, exceeded their designed speed.

Her main armament consisted of two breech-loading (BL)  Mk X guns in single gun turrets, one each fore and aft of the superstructure. Her secondary armament of twelve BL 6-inch Mk VII guns was arranged in casemates amidships. Eight of these were mounted on the main deck and were only usable in calm weather. A dozen quick-firing (QF) 12-pounder 12 cwt guns were fitted for defence against torpedo boats, eight on casemates on the upper deck and four in the superstructure. The ship also carried three 3-pounder Hotchkiss guns and two submerged 18-inch torpedo tubes.

The armour of the gun turrets and their barbettes was 6 inches thick while the casemate armour was 5 inches thick.

Construction and service
Sutlej, named to commemorate two battles on the Sutlej River during the First Anglo-Sikh War, was laid down by John Brown & Company at their shipyard in Clydebank on 15 August 1898 and launched on 18 November 1899. She took part in the fleet review held at Spithead on 16 August 1902 for the coronation of King Edward VII, and visited the Aegean Sea with other ships of the Channel Squadron for combined manoeuvres with the Mediterranean fleet the following month. In October 1902 she escorted the damaged battleship HMS Hood from Gibraltar to Chatham.

She was later re-assigned to the China Station and remained there until May 1906 when she became a boys' training ship in the North America and West Indies Station. The ship returned home in 1909 and became flagship of the reserve Third Fleet until 1910. Whilst on manoeuvers off Berehaven, Ireland on 15 July, she had a boiler explosion that killed four men.

A few days after the start of the war, Sutlej was assigned to the 9th Cruiser Squadron (CS) for convoy escort duties off the French and Iberian coasts. She was transferred to 11th Cruiser Squadron in Ireland in February 1915 for similar duties. Sent to the Azores in February 1916 and rejoined the 9th CS in September. She was paid off at Devonport on 4 May 1917 and became an accommodation ship. In January 1918 she became a depot ship at Rosyth and was renamed Crescent. She reverted to Sutlej in 1919 before she was sold on 9 May 1921 to Thos. W. Ward and laid up in Belfast. Sutlej arrived at Preston, Lancashire on 15 August 1924 to be broken up.

Notes

Footnotes

Bibliography 
 
 
 
 
 
 
 
 

 

Cressy-class cruisers
Ships built on the River Clyde
World War I cruisers of the United Kingdom
1899 ships